Magnus M. Norðdahl (Magnus M. Norddahl) is a lawyer in Iceland, currently serving as Chief Lawyer for the Icelandic Confederation of Labour -  ASI and a former member of Alþingi.

References

21st-century Icelandic lawyers
Living people
Members of the Althing
Year of birth missing (living people)